WAGC-LD (channel 14) was a low-power television station in Atlanta, Georgia, United States. Originally W42AO and then WAGC-LP in Athens, Georgia, its digital replacement was located at the North Druid Hills tower site in Atlanta. The station was most recently known to air "Broadcast News Network" (BNN), repeating infomercials in a news-report format.

Channel 14 also had a long-standing application for a WSB-TV translator Rome, Georgia, the city of license for WPXA-TV, which used 14 until the forced analog shutdown in 2009 pushed it to 51.

The Federal Communications Commission (FCC) canceled WAGC-LD's license on July 15, 2022, due to the station's extended period of silence and failure to construct new facilities.

AGC-LD
Television channels and stations established in 2013
2013 establishments in Georgia (U.S. state)
Defunct television stations in the United States
Television channels and stations disestablished in 2022
2022 disestablishments in Georgia (U.S. state)
AGC-LD